This article includes a list of countries of the world sorted by received foreign direct investment (FDI) stock, the level of accumulated FDI in a country. The US dollar estimates presented here are calculated at market or government official exchange rates.

The list estimates for 31 December of the indicated year, according to the CIA World Factbook. Non-sovereign states are italicised.

See also
List of countries by FDI abroad

References

 

Lists of countries by economic indicator
Foreign direct investment
Inward investment